Kampos is a village in the Nicosia District of Cyprus, located in the Paphos Forest.

References

Communities in Nicosia District